George Henry Sauer Jr. (November 10, 1943 – May 7, 2013) was an American football wide receiver who played six seasons for the American Football League's New York Jets, and later played in the World Football League. He played college football for the Texas Longhorns. His father, George Henry Sauer Sr., played for the Green Bay Packers from 1935 through 1937.

Biography
Sauer played college football for the Texas Longhorns as a wide receiver. He was a member of the undefeated 1963 Longhorns, and of the 1964 Longhorns that defeated previously unbeaten Alabama in the 1965 Orange Bowl. After being teammates at Texas, Sauer and quarterback Jim Hudson continued as teammates for the New York Jets for five seasons, 1965 through 1969. Sauer led the American Football League (AFL) in receptions in the 1967 season. In 1968, he started and caught eight passes for the Jets in the third AFL-NFL World Championship Game, helping defeat the NFL's heavily favored Baltimore Colts. His eight receptions and 133 yards led all receivers in that game.

Sauer retired at the peak of his career following the 1970 NFL season because he considered professional football dehumanizing.  In a 1971 interview with the Institute for the Study of Sport and Society, Sauer said, "When you get to the college and professional levels, the coaches still treat you as an adolescent.  They know damn well that you were never given a chance to become responsible or self-disciplined. Even in the pros, you were told when to go to bed, when to turn your lights off, when to wake up, when to eat and what to eat. You even have to live and eat together like you were in a boys’ camp."  Sauer's father, on the subject of his son's retirement, stated, "He definitely does not like to be regimented."

In spite of his disillusionment about playing professional football, Sauer returned to play for the New York Stars of the World Football League in 1974. That season, Sauer caught 38 passes for 547 yards, good for 14.4 yards per catch and three touchdowns.

After retiring, Sauer pursued writing and completed a novel. He also coached a minor league football team in the late 1970s.  As of 1994, the same year as his father's death, Sauer was a textbook graphics specialist living in Saint Paul, Minnesota.  He died on May 7, 2013, in Westerville, Ohio, of congestive heart failure, having suffered from Alzheimer's disease.

See also
 List of American Football League players

References

1943 births
2013 deaths
American football wide receivers
Charlotte Hornets (WFL) players
New York Stars players
New York Jets players
Texas Longhorns football players
American Football League All-League players
American Football League All-Star players
Sportspeople from Sheboygan, Wisconsin
Players of American football from Wisconsin
American Football League players
Waco High School alumni